Aghcheh Qeshlaq-e Olya (also Romanized as Āghcheh Qeshlāq-e ‘Olyā; also known as Āghcheh Qeshlāq-e Bālā, Aghjeh Gheshlagh Jadīd, Āghjeh Qeshlāq-e Bālā, Agja Qishlāq, Āqcheh Qeshlāq-e Jadīd, Āqcheh Qeshlāq-e ‘Olyā, and Āqjeh Qeshlāq) is a village in Peyghan Chayi Rural District, in the Central District of Kaleybar County, East Azerbaijan Province, Iran. At the 2006 census, its population was 74, in 15 families.

References 

Populated places in Kaleybar County